The June 2010 San Francisco general elections were held on June 8, 2010 in San Francisco, California. The elections included seats to various political parties' county central committees, two seats to the San Francisco County Superior Court, and seven ballot measures.

Superior Court

Seat 6

Seat 15 

As no candidate had more than 50% of the votes, a runoff election will be held between the two highest vote-getting candidates in the November 2010 election.

Propositions 

Note: "City" refers to the San Francisco municipal government.

Proposition A 

Proposition A would authorize the San Francisco Unified School District to assess a special property tax to pay for maintenance, repair, and seismic retrofitting of public school buildings and child care center buildings. This proposition requires a two-thirds majority to pass.

Proposition B 

Proposition B would authorize the City to issue $412.3 million in bonds for the maintenance, repair, and seismic retrofitting of the City's fire hydrant system, fire stations, and police stations, and would fund the construction of a new "Public Safety Building" in the Mission Bay neighborhood. This proposition requires a two-thirds majority to pass.

Proposition C 

Proposition C would entrench the City's 11-member Film Commission, previously created by ordinance, into the city charter, with the Mayor appointing six members and the San Francisco Board of Supervisors' Rules Committee appointing five, all subject to approval by the full Board. The composition and duties of the commission would also be entrenched into the city charter.

Proposition D 

Proposition D would change the retirement benefits formula for new City employees by increasing their contributions into the San Francisco Employees' Retirement System and require that any savings due to fewer City contributions into the fund be sent to the Retiree Health Care Trust Fund.

Proposition E 

Proposition E would require the annual Police Department budget to specify the costs of security for City officials and visiting dignitaries.

Proposition F 

Proposition F would amend the rent ordinance to allow a tenant to file, under certain conditions, for a financial hardship application, subject to the final decision of an Administration Law Judge, that may prohibit the landlord from increasing rent on the tenant for a specific amount of time.

Proposition G 

Proposition G would make it City policy to have the Transbay Transit Center as the northern terminal of the San Francisco–Los Angeles high-speed rail line.

External links 
 San Francisco Department of Elections
 City and County of San Francisco Consolidated Statewide Direct Primary - June 8, 2010 Statement of Votes

San Francisco 06
2010 06
Elections 06
San Francisco 06
2010s in San Francisco